Sefidrud Dam  (originally named Shahbanu Farah Dam and also known as the Manjil Dam) is a buttress dam on the Sefīd-Rūd in the Alborz mountain range, located near Manjil in Gilan Province, northern Iran.

It was constructed to store water for irrigation and produce hydroelectric power. The power station has an installed capacity of 87 MW. Its structure contains 26 monoliths.

The extremely destructive 1990 Manjil–Rudbar earthquake occurred near the dam and caused portions of its concrete to crack. Repairs and mitigation efforts were undertaken in 1991.

See also

List of power stations in Iran

References

Dams in Gilan Province
Buttress dams
Hydroelectric power stations in Iran
Alborz (mountain range)
Buildings and structures in Gilan Province
Dams completed in 1962
Energy infrastructure completed in 1962
1962 establishments in Iran
Caspian Sea basin